Pacifica High School is a high school in Garden Grove, California, United States, within the Garden Grove Unified School District. It opened in 1965 and has enrolled more than two thousand students yearly. The communities serving Pacifica are western Garden Grove and sections of Stanton and Cypress.

Campus

A campus landmark is a Navy anchor in the quad. At first painted blue but repainted black in 2011, the anchor was donated by the U.S Navy. On May 1, a new gym opened. The new gymnasium is a state-of-the-art building that is an 18,250-square foot multi-function facility that houses three full-size basketball courts and can convert to nine volleyball courts. The gym allows for seating for up to 1,584 people and includes a lobby, locker rooms, coach's offices, equipment storage, and more. The first shot was made by Freshman coach Mike Buneafe, whose grandfather, Al Buneafe founded Pacifica High school.

Athletics
Pacifica's sports teams, the Mariners, compete in the Empire League of the California Interscholastic Federation's Southern Section. Before 2006, they competed in the Garden Grove League with the other schools in the district.

Sports offerings are:

Football (boys)
Cross Country (coed)
Tennis (coed)
Volleyball (coed)
Waterpolo (coed)
Basketball (coed)
Soccer (coed)
Wrestling (boys)
Baseball (boys)
Softball (girls)
Swim (coed)
Track (coed)
Golf (coed)

Marching band and drumline
In 2003 and from 2005 through 2009, the Pacifica marching band's drumline took the Southern California Percussion Alliance gold medal, and from 2006 through 2009, it garnered the Winter Guard International World Championship gold medal in the Percussion Scholastic Open division, along with numerous first-place finishes throughout Southern California.  Pacifica also finished with a Percussion Alliance bronze medal in 2004 and a Winter Guard International silver medal in 2005.  The Pacifica drumline is the second ensemble to have captured four consecutive WGI World Championship golds.

Notable alumni

Danny Barber, pro soccer
Pam Bileck, Olympics gymnast
Jeff Carlson, professional football
Jon Dorenbos, professional football and magician
Michelle Dusserre, Olympics gymnast
Larry Fortensky, construction worker, husband of actress Elizabeth Taylor
Monique Powell, Lead singer for the band Save Ferris  https://www.imdb.com/name/nm0694243/
Amanda Freed, Olympics softball
Dexter Holland, Offspring lead singer and guitarist
Norm Johnson, professional football
Greg Kriesel, Offspring musician
Terry Kubicka, Olympics figure skating
Jeffree Star, YouTuber
Kevin Wasserman, guitarist

References

External links
 

Educational institutions established in 1965
High schools in Orange County, California
Education in Garden Grove, California
Public high schools in California
1965 establishments in California